Krill are small crustaceans of the order Euphausiacea, and are found in all the world's oceans. The name "krill" comes from the Norwegian word , meaning "small fry of fish", which is also often attributed to species of fish.

Krill are considered an important trophic level connection – near the bottom of the food chain.  They feed on phytoplankton and (to a lesser extent) zooplankton, yet also are the main source of food for many larger animals. In the Southern Ocean, one species, the Antarctic krill, Euphausia superba, makes up an estimated biomass of around 379,000,000 tonnes, making it among the species with the largest total biomass. Over half of this biomass is eaten by whales, seals, penguins, seabirds, squid, and fish each year. Most krill species display large daily vertical migrations, thus providing food for predators near the surface at night and in deeper waters during the day.

Krill are fished commercially in the Southern Ocean and in the waters around Japan. The total global harvest amounts to 150,000–200,000 tonnes annually, most of this from the Scotia Sea. Most of the krill catch is used for aquaculture and aquarium feeds, as bait in sport fishing, or in the pharmaceutical industry. They are eaten as camarones in Spain and Philippines. In the Philippines, krill are also known as alamang and are used to make a salty paste called bagoóng.

Krill are also the main prey of baleen whales, including the blue whale.

Taxonomy 
Krill belong to the large arthropod subphylum, the Crustacea. The most familiar and largest group of crustaceans, the class Malacostraca, includes the superorder Eucarida comprising the three orders, Euphausiacea (krill), Decapoda (shrimp, prawns, lobsters, crabs), and the planktonic Amphionidacea.

The order Euphausiacea comprises two families. The more abundant Euphausiidae contains 10 different genera with a total of 85 species. Of these, the genus Euphausia is the largest, with 31 species. The lesser known family, the Bentheuphausiidae, has only one species, Bentheuphausia amblyops, a bathypelagic krill living in deep waters below . It is considered the most primitive extant krill species.

Well-known species of the Euphausiidae of commercial krill fisheries include Antarctic krill (Euphausia superba), Pacific krill (E. pacifica) and Northern krill (Meganyctiphanes norvegica).

Phylogeny

, the order Euphausiacea is believed to be monophyletic due to several unique conserved morphological characteristics (autapomorphy) such as its naked filamentous gills and thin thoracopods and by molecular studies.

There have been many theories of the location of the order Euphausiacea. Since the first description of Thysanopode tricuspide by Henri Milne-Edwards in 1830, the similarity of their biramous thoracopods had led zoologists to group euphausiids and Mysidacea in the order Schizopoda, which was split by Johan Erik Vesti Boas in 1883 into two separate orders. Later, William Thomas Calman (1904) ranked the Mysidacea in the superorder Peracarida and euphausiids in the superorder Eucarida, although even up to the 1930s the order Schizopoda was advocated. It was later also proposed that order Euphausiacea should be grouped with the Penaeidae (family of prawns) in the Decapoda based on developmental similarities, as noted by Robert Gurney and Isabella Gordon. The reason for this debate is that krill share some morphological features of decapods and others of mysids.

Molecular studies have not unambiguously grouped them, possibly due to the paucity of key rare species such as Bentheuphausia amblyops in krill and Amphionides reynaudii in Eucarida. One study supports the monophyly of Eucarida (with basal Mysida), another groups Euphausiacea with Mysida (the Schizopoda), while yet another groups Euphausiacea with Hoplocarida.

Timeline
No extant fossil can be unequivocally assigned to Euphausiacea. Some extinct eumalacostracan taxa have been thought to be euphausiaceans such as Anthracophausia, Crangopsis – now assigned to the Aeschronectida (Hoplocarida) – and Palaeomysis.

Distribution 

Krill occur worldwide in all oceans, although many individual species have endemic or neritic (i.e., coastal) distributions. Bentheuphausia amblyops, a bathypelagic species, has a cosmopolitan distribution within its deep-sea habitat.

Species of the genus Thysanoessa occur in both Atlantic and Pacific oceans. The Pacific is home to Euphausia pacifica. Northern krill occur across the Atlantic from the Mediterranean Sea northward.

Species with neritic distributions include the four species of the genus Nyctiphanes. They are highly abundant along the upwelling regions of the California, Humboldt, Benguela, and Canarias current systems. Another species having only neritic distribution is E. crystallorophias, which is endemic to the Antarctic coastline.

Species with endemic distributions include Nyctiphanes capensis, which occurs only in the Benguela current, E. mucronata in the Humboldt current, and the six Euphausia species native to the Southern Ocean.

In the Antarctic, seven species are known, one in genus Thysanoessa (T. macrura) and six in Euphausia. Both are found at latitudes south of 55° S, with E. crystallorophias dominating south of 74° S and in regions of pack ice. Other species known in the Southern Ocean are E. frigida, E. longirostris, E. triacantha and E. vallentini.

Anatomy and morphology 

Krill are decapod crustaceans and, as do all crustaceans they have a chitinous external skeleton. They have the standard decapod anatomy with their bodies made up of three parts: the cephalothorax is composed of the head and the thorax, which are fused, the pleon, which bears the ten swimming legs, and the tail fan. This outer shell of krill is transparent in most species. 

Krill feature intricate compound eyes. Some species adapt to different lighting conditions through the use of screening pigments. 

They have two antennae and several pairs of thoracic legs called pereiopods or thoracopods, so named because they are attached to the thorax. Their number varies among genera and species. These thoracic legs include feeding legs and grooming legs. 

Krill are decapods, so all species have five pairs of swimming legs called "swimmerets", very similar to those of a lobster or freshwater crayfish. 

The largest krill species, Thysanopoda spinicaudata, lives deep in the open ocean. Krill can be easily distinguished from other crustaceans such as true shrimp by their externally visible gills.

Except for Bentheuphausia amblyops, krill are bioluminescent animals having organs called photophores that can emit light. The light is generated by an enzyme-catalysed chemiluminescence reaction, wherein a luciferin (a kind of pigment) is activated by a luciferase enzyme. Studies indicate that the luciferin of many krill species is a fluorescent tetrapyrrole similar but not identical to dinoflagellate luciferin and that the krill probably do not produce this substance themselves but acquire it as part of their diet, which contains dinoflagellates. Krill photophores are complex organs with lenses and focusing abilities, and can be rotated by muscles. The precise function of these organs is as yet unknown; possibilities include mating, social interaction or orientation and as a form of counter-illumination camouflage to compensate their shadow against overhead ambient light.

Ecology

Feeding
Many krill are filter feeders: their frontmost appendages, the thoracopods, form very fine combs with which they can filter out their food from the water. These filters can be very fine in species (such as Euphausia spp.) that feed primarily on phytoplankton, in particular on diatoms, which are unicellular algae. Krill are mostly omnivorous, although a few species are carnivorous, preying on small zooplankton and fish larvae.

Krill are an important element of the aquatic food chain. Krill convert the primary production of their prey into a form suitable for consumption by larger animals that cannot feed directly on the minuscule algae. Northern krill and some other species have a relatively small filtering basket and actively hunt copepods and larger zooplankton.

Predation
Many animals feed on krill, ranging from smaller animals like fish or penguins to larger ones like seals and baleen whales.

Disturbances of an ecosystem resulting in a decline in the krill population can have far-reaching effects. During a coccolithophore bloom in the Bering Sea in 1998, for instance, the diatom concentration dropped in the affected area. Krill cannot feed on the smaller coccolithophores, and consequently the krill population (mainly E. pacifica) in that region declined sharply. This in turn affected other species: the shearwater population dropped. The incident was thought to have been one reason salmon did not spawn that season.

Several single-celled endoparasitoidic ciliates of the genus Collinia can infect species of krill and devastate affected populations. Such diseases were reported for Thysanoessa inermis in the Bering Sea and also for E. pacifica, Thysanoessa spinifera, and T. gregaria off the North American Pacific coast. Some ectoparasites of the family Dajidae (epicaridean isopods) afflict krill (and also shrimp and mysids); one such parasite is Oculophryxus bicaulis, which was found on the krill Stylocheiron affine and S. longicorne. It attaches itself to the animal's eyestalk and sucks blood from its head; it apparently inhibits the host's reproduction, as none of the afflicted animals reached maturity.

Climate change poses another threat to krill populations.

Plastics
Preliminary research indicates krill can digest microplastics under  in diameter, breaking them down and excreting them back into the environment in smaller form.

Life history and behavior 

The life cycle of krill is relatively well understood, despite minor variations in detail from species to species. After krill hatch, they experience several larval stages—nauplius, pseudometanauplius, metanauplius, calyptopsis, and furcilia, each of which divides into sub-stages. The pseudometanauplius stage is exclusive to species that lay their eggs within an ovigerous sac: so-called "sac-spawners". The larvae grow and moult repeatedly as they develop, replacing their rigid exoskeleton when it becomes too small. Smaller animals moult more frequently than larger ones. Yolk reserves within their body nourish the larvae through metanauplius stage.

By the calyptopsis stages differentiation has progressed far enough for them to develop a mouth and a digestive tract, and they begin to eat phytoplankton. By that time their yolk reserves are exhausted and the larvae must have reached the photic zone, the upper layers of the ocean where algae flourish. During the furcilia stages, segments with pairs of swimmerets are added, beginning at the frontmost segments. Each new pair becomes functional only at the next moult. The number of segments added during any one of the furcilia stages may vary even within one species depending on environmental conditions. After the final furcilia stage, an immature juvenile emerges in a shape similar to an adult, and subsequently develops gonads and matures sexually.

Reproduction

During the mating season, which varies by species and climate, the male deposits a sperm sack at the female's genital opening (named thelycum). The females can carry several thousand eggs in their ovary, which may then account for as much as one third of the animal's body mass. Krill can have multiple broods in one season, with interbrood intervals lasting on the order of days.

Krill employ two types of spawning mechanism. The 57 species of the genera Bentheuphausia, Euphausia, Meganyctiphanes, Thysanoessa, and Thysanopoda are "broadcast spawners": the female releases the fertilised eggs into the water, where they usually sink, disperse, and are on their own. These species generally hatch in the nauplius 1 stage, but have recently been discovered to hatch sometimes as metanauplius or even as calyptopis stages. The remaining 29 species of the other genera are "sac spawners", where the female carries the eggs with her, attached to the rearmost pairs of thoracopods until they hatch as metanauplii, although some species like Nematoscelis difficilis may hatch as nauplius or pseudometanauplius.

Moulting
Moulting occurs whenever a specimen outgrows its rigid exoskeleton. Young animals, growing faster, moult more often than older and larger ones. The frequency of moulting varies widely by species and is, even within one species, subject to many external factors such as latitude, water temperature, and food availability. The subtropical species Nyctiphanes simplex, for instance, has an overall inter-moult period of two to seven days: larvae moult on the average every four days, while juveniles and adults do so, on average, every six days. E. superba is able to reduce its body size when there is not enough food available, moulting also when its exoskeleton becomes too large. Similar shrinkage has also been observed for E. pacifica, a species occurring in the Pacific Ocean from polar to temperate zones, as an adaptation to abnormally high water temperatures. Shrinkage has been postulated for other temperate-zone species of krill as well.

Lifespan
Some high-latitude species of krill can live for more than six years (e.g., Euphausia superba); others, such as the mid-latitude species Euphausia pacifica, live for only two years. Subtropical or tropical species' longevity is still shorter, e.g., Nyctiphanes simplex, which usually lives for only six to eight months.

Swarming

Most krill are swarming animals; the sizes and densities of such swarms vary by species and region. For Euphausia superba, swarms reach 10,000 to 60,000 individuals per cubic meter. Swarming is a defensive mechanism, confusing smaller predators that would like to pick out individuals. In 2012, Gandomi and Alavi presented what appears to be a successful stochastic algorithm for modelling the behaviour of krill swarms. The algorithm is based on three main factors: " (i) movement induced by the presence of other individuals (ii) foraging activity, and (iii) random diffusion."

Vertical migration

Krill typically follow a diurnal vertical migration. It has been assumed that they spend the day at greater depths and rise during the night toward the surface. The deeper they go, the more they reduce their activity, apparently to reduce encounters with predators and to conserve energy. Swimming activity in krill varies with stomach fullness. Sated animals that had been feeding at the surface swim less actively and therefore sink below the mixed layer. As they sink they produce feces which implies a role in the Antarctic carbon cycle. Krill with empty stomachs swim more actively and thus head towards the surface.

Vertical migration may be a 2–3 times daily occurrence. Some species (e.g., Euphausia superba, E. pacifica, E. hanseni, Pseudeuphausia latifrons, and Thysanoessa spinifera) form surface swarms during the day for feeding and reproductive purposes even though such behaviour is dangerous because it makes them extremely vulnerable to predators.

Experimental studies using Artemia salina as a model suggest that the vertical migrations of krill several hundreds of metres, in groups tens of metres deep, could collectively create enough downward jets of water to have a significant effect on ocean mixing.

Dense swarms can elicit a feeding frenzy among fish, birds and mammal predators, especially near the surface. When disturbed, a swarm scatters, and some individuals have even been observed to moult instantly, leaving the exuvia behind as a decoy.

Krill normally swim at a pace of 5–10 cm/s (2–3 body lengths per second), using their swimmerets for propulsion. Their larger migrations are subject to ocean currents. Their swimming performance has led many researchers to classify adult krill as micro-nektonic life-forms, i.e., small animals capable of individual motion against (weak) currents. Larval forms of krill are generally considered zooplankton.

Biogeochemical cycles

The Antarctic krill is an important species in the context of biogeochemical cycling and in the Antarctic food web. It plays a prominent role in the Southern Ocean because of its ability to cycle nutrients and to feed penguins and baleen and blue whales.

Human uses

Harvesting history
Krill have been harvested as a food source for humans and domesticated animals since at least the 19th century, and possibly earlier in Japan, where it was known as okiami. Large-scale fishing developed in the late 1960s and early 1970s, and now occurs only in Antarctic waters and in the seas around Japan. Historically, the largest krill fishery nations were Japan and the Soviet Union, or, after the latter's dissolution, Russia and Ukraine. The harvest peaked, which in 1983 was about 528,000 tonnes in the Southern Ocean alone (of which the Soviet Union took in 93%), is now managed as a precaution against overfishing.

In 1993, two events caused a decline in krill fishing: Russia exited the industry; and the Convention for the Conservation of Antarctic Marine Living Resources (CCAMLR) defined maximum catch quotas for a sustainable exploitation of Antarctic krill. After an October 2011 review, the Commission decided not to change the quota.

The annual Antarctic catch stabilised at around 100,000 tonnes, which is roughly one fiftieth of the CCAMLR catch quota. The main limiting factor was probably high costs along with political and legal issues. The Japanese fishery saturated at some 70,000 tonnes.

Although krill are found worldwide, fishing in Southern Oceans are preferred because the krill are more "catchable" and abundant in these regions. Particularly in Antarctic seas which are considered as pristine, they are considered a "clean product".

In 2018 it was announced that almost every krill fishing company operating in Antarctica will abandon operations in huge areas around the Antarctic Peninsula from 2020, including "buffer zones" around breeding colonies of penguins.

Human consumption

  
Although the total biomass of Antarctic krill may be as abundant as 400 million tonnes, the human impact on this keystone species is growing, with a 39% increase in total fishing yield to 294,000 tonnes over 2010–2014. Major countries involved in krill harvesting are Norway (56% of total catch in 2014), the Republic of Korea (19%), and China (18%).

Krill is a rich source of protein and omega-3 fatty acids which are under development in the early 21st century as human food, dietary supplements as oil capsules, livestock food, and pet food. Krill tastes salty with a somewhat stronger fish flavor than shrimp. For mass-consumption and commercially prepared products, they must be peeled to remove the inedible exoskeleton.

In 2011, the US Food and Drug Administration published a letter of no objection for a manufactured krill oil product to be generally recognized as safe (GRAS) for human consumption.

Krill (and other planktonic shrimp, notably Acetes spp.) are most widely consumed in Southeast Asia, where it is fermented (with the shells intact) and usually ground finely to make shrimp paste. It can be stir-fried and eaten paired with white rice or used to add umami flavors to a wide variety of traditional dishes. The liquid from the fermentation process is also harvested as fish sauce.

See also 

 Antarctic krill
 Cold-water shrimp
 Crustacean
 Krill fishery
 Krill oil
 Northern krill

References

Further reading 

 Boden, Brian P.; Johnson, Martin W.; Brinton, Edward: "Euphausiacea (Crustacea) of the North Pacific". Bulletin of the Scripps Institution of Oceanography. Volume 6 Number 8, 1955.
 Brinton, Edward: "Euphausiids of Southeast Asian waters". Naga Report volume 4, part 5. La Jolla: University of California, Scripps Institution of Oceanography, 1975.
 Conway, D. V. P.; White, R. G.; Hugues-Dit-Ciles, J.; Galienne, C. P.; Robins, D. B.: Guide to the coastal and surface zooplankton of the South-Western Indian Ocean , Order Euphausiacea, Occasional Publication of the Marine Biological Association of the United Kingdom No. 15, Plymouth, UK, 2003.
 Everson, I. (ed.): Krill: biology, ecology and fisheries. Oxford, Blackwell Science; 2000. .
 
 Mauchline, J.: Euphausiacea: Adults , Conseil International pour l'Exploration de la Mer, 1971. Identification sheets for adult krill with many line drawings. PDF file, 2 Mb.
 Mauchline, J.: Euphausiacea: Larvae , Conseil International pour l'Exploration de la Mer, 1971. Identification sheets for larval stages of krill with many line drawings. PDF file, 3 Mb.
 Tett, P.: The biology of Euphausiids, lecture notes from a 2003 course in Marine Biology from Napier University.
 Tett, P.: Bioluminescence, lecture notes from the 1999/2000 edition of that same course.

External links

 Webcam of Krill Aquarium at Australian Antarctic Division
 'Antarctic Energies' animation by Lisa Roberts

 
Malacostraca
Commercial crustaceans
Edible crustaceans
Extant Early Cretaceous first appearances
Taxa named by James Dwight Dana